May Events is a Czech comedy film directed by Václav Berdych and Martin Frič. It was released in 1951.

Cast
 Jaroslav Marvan as Jan Sebesta, heating engineer
 Ella Nollová as Ruzena Sebestová
 Jana Dítětová as Lída Sebestová, saleswoman
 Miloš Vavruška as Josef Brejcha, striker
 Otto Motyčka as Václav Hrabe, shoemaker
 Milada Smolíková as Eliska Hrabetová
 Milan Balašov as Jirka Sebesta, apprentice
 Milada Kemlinková as Verka Sebestová
 Bohuš Hradil as Ing. Votruba
 Theodor Pištěk as Burger, master
 Mirko Čech as Simek
 Antonín Holzinger as Doubek, welder
 Eman Fiala as Koula, gunner
 Rudolf Lampa as Skála, editor
 Karel Houska as Storkán, millwright
 Josef Chvalina as Franta Kadlec
 Fanda Mrázek as Baďura
 Ladislav Kulhánek as Válek
 Zdenka Procházková as Nováková the saleswoman
 Alena Kadeřábková as salesgirl Libichová
 Radim Nikodém as Bonbon
 Jindra Hermanová as Mrs. in the shop
 Alois Dvorský as old man in the parade
 Vladimír Dvorský as role unspecified
 František Miroslav Doubrava as Soukup
 Ferdinand Jarkovský as Technopol gatekeeper
 Dagmar Hyková as daughter of the Hrabět family
 Hynek Němec as Jedlička, a worker
 Jaroslav Heyduk as Gustav Režný
 Josef Najman as worker Novotný
 Stanislav Lužický as role unspecified
 Vladimír Klemens as plumber
 Karel Friml as role unspecified

References

External links
 

1951 films
1950s Czech-language films
1951 comedy films
Films directed by Martin Frič
Czechoslovak black-and-white films
Czechoslovak comedy films
1950s Czech films